Events in the year 2021 in Zambia.

Incumbents
President: Edgar Lungu

Events
Ongoing — COVID-19 pandemic in Zambia
 12 August - Zambian President Edgar Lungu deploys army members throughout the country as Zambia holds election.
 14 August - Incumbent President Lungu states that the 2021 general election was not free and fair.
 16 August - Hakainde Hichilema is declared winner of the 2021 Zambian general election
 *24 August - Hakainde Hichilema is sworn in as the 7th Republican President of Zambia

Deaths

January  
13 January – Moses Hamungole, Roman Catholic prelate, Bishop of Monze (b. 1967).
21 January – Anthony Mwamba, 61, boxing promoter; COVID-19.

June 
 
 17 June – Kenneth Kaunda, 97, Zambian politician; pneumonia (b. 1924).
 20 June – Irene Mambilima, 69, chief justice.

November 

 18 November – Levy Mkandawire, 60, Zambian politician.

See also

International Conference on the Great Lakes Region
COVID-19 pandemic in Africa

References

 
2020s in Zambia
Years of the 21st century in Zambia
Zambia
Zambia